A political prisoner is someone imprisoned for their political activity. The political offense is not always the official reason for the prisoner's detention.

There is no internationally recognized legal definition of the concept, although numerous similar definitions have been proposed by various organizations and scholars, and there is a general consensus among scholars that "individuals have been sanctioned by legal systems and imprisoned by political regimes not for their violation of codified laws but for their thoughts and ideas that have fundamentally challenged existing power relations". The status of a political prisoner is generally awarded to individuals based on declarations of non-governmental organizations like Amnesty International, on a case-by-case basis. While such status are often widely recognized by the international public opinion, they are often rejected by individual governments accused of holding political prisoners, which tend to deny any bias in their judicial systems.

A related term is prisoner of conscience, popularized by Amnesty International. It describes someone who was prosecuted because of their personal beliefs.

Some prisons, known as political prisons, are focused or even dedicated solely to hosting political prisoners.

Definitions
The concept of a political prisoner, like many concepts in social sciences, sports numerous definitions, and is undefined in international law and human right treaties.  Helen Taylor Greene and Shaun L. Gabbidon in 2009 that "standard legal definitions have remained elusive", but at the same time, observing that there is a general consensus that "individuals have been sanctioned by legal systems and imprisoned by political regimes not for their violation of codified laws but for their thoughts and ideas that have fundamentally challenged existing power relations".

A number of organizations involved in human rights issues, as well as scholars studying them, have developed their own definitions, some of which are presented below.

Organizations

Amnesty International
Amnesty International (AI) campaigns for the release of prisoners of conscience, which include both political prisoners as well as those imprisoned for their religious or philosophical beliefs.  To reduce controversy, and as a matter of principle, the organization's policy applies only to prisoners who have not committed or advocated violence. Thus, there are political prisoners who do not fit the narrower criteria for POCs. The organisation defines the differences as follows:
AI uses the term "political prisoner" broadly. It does not use it, as some others do, to imply that all such prisoners have a special status or should be released. It uses the term only to define a category of prisoners for whom AI demands a fair and prompt trial.

In AI's usage, the term includes any prisoner whose case has a significant political element: whether the motivation of the prisoner's acts, the acts in themselves, or the motivation of the authorities.

"Political" is used by AI to refer to aspects of human relations related to "politics": the mechanisms of society and civil order, the principles, organization, or conduct of government or public affairs, and the relation of all these to questions of language, ethnic origin, sex or religion, status or influence (among other factors).

The category of political prisoners embraces the category of prisoners of conscience, the only prisoners who AI demands should be immediately and unconditionally released, as well as people who resort to criminal violence for a political motive.

In AI's use of the term, here are some examples of political prisoners:
 a person accused or convicted of an ordinary crime carried out for political motives, such as murder or robbery carried out to support the objectives of an opposition group;
 a person accused or convicted of an ordinary crime committed in a political context, such as at a demonstration by a trade union or a peasants' organization;
 a member or suspected member of an armed opposition group who has been charged with treason or "subversion".

Governments often say they have no political prisoners, only prisoners held under the normal criminal law. AI however describes cases like the examples given above as "political" and uses the terms "political trial" and "political imprisonment" when referring to them. But by doing so AI does not oppose the imprisonment, except where it further maintains that the prisoner is a prisoner of conscience, or condemn the trial, except where it concludes that it was unfair.

Parliamentary Assembly of the Council of Europe
The Parliamentary Assembly of the Council of Europe has the following definition:
A person deprived of their personal liberty is to be regarded as a 'political prisoner':

Assistance Association for Political Prisoners
Burmese Assistance Association for Political Prisoners defines a political prisoner as "anyone who is arrested because of [their] perceived or real involvement in or supporting role in opposition movements with peaceful or resistance means."

Congressional-Executive Commission on China 
The US Congressional-Executive Commission on China defines a political prisoner broadly as any individual who is detained for exercising “[their] human rights under international law, such as peaceable assembly, freedom of religion, freedom of association, free expression including the freedom to advocate peaceable social or political change, and to criticize government policy or government officials.”.

Academics

Steinert (2020) 
Christoph Valentin Steinert, who in 2020 reviewed 366 definitions of political prisoners used in (mainly English language) academic literature in 1956 and 2019, argued that any definition of political prisoner needs to avoid focusing on prisoners’ individual motivations and the term "should be exclusively reserved for victims of politically biased trials" (in other words, "victims of state repression"), to avoid delegitimizing the term by diluting it with applications to prisoners of any possibly politically motivated action (which on extreme end of spectrum would include, for example, Ku Klux Klanners, neo-Nazis, and jihadist terrorists). He specifically criticizes definitions of political prisoners as "individuals imprisoned for politically motivated actions" or "committing a political offense". He proposed the following definition:

Political prisoners are defined as individuals that are convicted and incarcerated in politically biased trials (or executive decisions in absence of any trials). Trials are deemed politically biased if they are endorsed by the government and (a) lack a domestic legal basis, (b) violate principles of procedural justice, or (c) violate universal human rights.

Steinert noted that his definition does extend to prisoners "imprisoned for nonpolitical identities such as their religious beliefs or their sexual orientations", as well as individuals engaged in violent actions, arguing that the neutral "classification as a political prisoner neither entails an a priori judgment about the moral legitimacy of prisoners’ actions nor does it imply that individuals committed politically motivated crimes".

Other aspects
The purpose of political prisons and of imprisoning dissidents is to demonstrate the strength of the regime to the dissidents. The regime's opponents are isolated and stigmatised, frequently abused and tortured. The goal of such treatment is not just punish those opposing the regime, but to frighten those who consider opposing the regime by demonstrating the power of the regime by sending a clear warning that objecting is not tolerated, and that the regime is well prepared and ready to punish the objectors through creation of total institutions dedicated to hosting political prisoners.

The status of a political prisoner is conferred to one only after their detention. Before that, potential political prisoners may be considered "dissidents, revolutionaries, social reformers, or radical thinkers". The nature of the behavior that leads to political imprisonment is hard to define and can be roughly described as any "activity deemed questionable by ruling elites". Therefore, political prisoners are officially detained and sentenced for multitude of different transgressions, instead of for a single well defined crime. Political prisoners are frequently arrested and tried with a veneer of legality where false criminal charges, manufactured evidence, and unfair trials (kangaroo courts, show trials) are used to disguise the fact that an individual is a political prisoner. For example, AAPP states that "the motivation behind the arrest of every individual in AAPP’s database is political, regardless of the laws they have been sentenced under". This is common in situations which may otherwise be decried nationally and internationally as a human rights violation or suppression of a political dissident, and Steinert notes that "objective evidence about politically biased imprisonments is chronically sparse considering that governments face substantial incentives to hide repressive practices". In fact, all governments habitually deny accusations that they imprison any individuals for political activities.

A political prisoner can also be someone that has been denied bail unfairly, denied parole when it would reasonably have been given to a prisoner charged with a comparable crime, or special powers may be invoked by the judiciary. Particularly in this latter situation, whether an individual is regarded as a political prisoner may depend upon subjective political perspective or interpretation of the evidence. Political prisoners can also be imprisoned with no legal veneer by extrajudicial processes or through executive decisions in absence of any trials or even charges. Some political prisoners need not be imprisoned at all, as they can be subject to prolonged pre-trial detainment instead. Steinert noted that technically, political detainees should be distinguished from political prisoners, but they are often grouped together, and in practical terms, he recommends treating them as special types of political prisoners. Examples of such detainees can include individuals such as the former Nobel Peace Prize Laureate Aung San Suu Kyi, detained for many years without a trial. Likewise, supporters of Tibetan spiritual leader Gedhun Choekyi Nyima in the 11th Panchen Lama controversy have called him a "political prisoner", despite the fact that he is not accused of a political offense. He is held under secluded house arrest.

The status of a political prisoner can be significant, as such inmates can become the subjects of international advocacy and receive aid from various non-governmental organizations. Criticism from the international public opinion has been shown to facilitate release of political detainees, or reduce their sentences, but is less effective in securing release of already-sentenced individuals. When the status of a prisoner as political is well known, it can be seen as a form of status symbol, some political prisoners purposefully frame themselves as "the imprisoned martyrs and leaders of their movement", and this status can also be seen as "providing a guarantee of their security and of respect for their rights behind the bars".

History 
Ancient Greek philosopher Socrates has been described as perhaps the earliest known political prisoner; imprisoned for allegedly “poisoning” the minds of Grecian youth through his critique of Athenian society and its rulers. Early Christians, including Jesus Christ, and St. Peter, have also been described as such. Another famous historical figure described as a political prisoner is the 15th century French heroine, Joan of Arc, whose final charge of heresy was seen as a legal justification for her real crime of "inconveniencing the elites".

Padraic Kenney noted that "the emergence of modern political prisoners coincides with a fifty-year period (1860s–1910s) during which [modern] political movements matured around the world", also defining such movements as having "clearly articulated political and social programs" which forced the governments to develop a specific response to such movements (a response which often involved incarceration rather than dialogue, particularly under the less liberal regimes).

In some places, political prisoners had their own customs, traditions, and semi-formal organizations and privileges; historically, this has been more common up to around the interwar period, as the many political prisoners came from higher social classes (in particular, nobility), and authorities often treated them better than common criminals. This changed with the emergence of the totalitarian regimes, which attempted to throughout indoctrinate or eliminate any opposition. 

In Poland, the concept and even traditions of political prisoners emerged around the second half of the 19th century in the Russian partition.

While the Universal Declaration of Human Rights of 1948 is not legally binding, it is generally recognized as "a common standard of achievement for all peoples and all nations." Of particular relevance to political prisoners are its Articles 5, 6, 9 and 18. The UDHR and the later Helsinki Accords of 1975 have been used by a number of nongovernmental organizations as basis for arguing that some governments are in fact holding political prisoners.

In the United States, the term political prisoner has been used during the mid-20th century civil rights struggle and has been occasionally applied to individuals like Rosa Parks or Martin Luther King Jr., and later used for individuals imprisoned for objecting to US involvement in the Vietnam War.

Political prisoners sometimes write memoirs of their experiences and resulting insights. Some of these memoirs have become important political texts. For example, King's "Letter From a Birmingham City Jail" has been described as "one of the most important historical documents penned by a modern political prisoner".

Advocacy 
A number of nongovernmental organizations focuses on advocacy for political prisoners. The most prominent of those is Amnesty International, founded in 1961.

Notable political prisoners

Groups
 In the Soviet Union, dubious psychiatric diagnoses were sometimes used to confine political prisoners in the so-called "psikhushkas".
 In Nazi Germany, socialists and communists were among the first victims of fascist repression, later groups like the "Night and Fog" prisoners and priests.
 In the United States, African-American activists such as the Wilmington Ten (which included Benjamin Chavis), have been wrongfully imprisoned.
 Around 1000 British convicts sent to Australia in the 1700–1800s.
 According to human rights groups there are some 60,000 political prisoners in Egypt.
 In reaction to the failed coup attempt in Turkey on 15 July 2016, over 77,000 people have been formally arrested.
Many victims of the Cambodian genocide has been described as political prisoners.

Individuals

Due to the lack of single, internationally recognized legal definition of a political prisoner, nongovernmental organizations like Amnesty International, aided by legal scholars, determine whether prisoners meet their criteria of political prisoners on a case-by-case basis.

 Alváro Barreirinhas Cunhal, former pro-Soviet leader of the Portuguese Communist Party, he was imprisoned thrice (first in June 1937, then in 1940 and later from 1949 to 1960) for his staunch opposition to portuguese dictatorship and for his political beliefs as well as his close ties to Soviet Russia. He famously escaped Peniche Fortress, one of the regime's political prisons, with ten other men on the third of January 1960.
 Aung San Suu Kyi led the opposition National League for Democracy which was victorious in 1990 general election. She was imprisoned or under house arrest for 15 out of the 21 years from 1990 to 2010. In 2021, she was imprisoned by the Myanmar military in a coup d'état. As of August 2022, she is being held in solitary confinement serving a 17 year sentence following a series of secret trials.
 Benigno Aquino Jr. of the Philippines was imprisoned during the martial law in the Philippines because of his vocal opposition against then President Ferdinand Marcos. 
 Benazir Bhutto was a political prisoner for four years under General Zia ul Haq.
 Dietrich Bonhoeffer was a German pastor, theologian, anti-Nazi dissident, being accused of being associated with the 20 July plot to assassinate Adolf Hitler.
 Rubin "Hurricane" Carter, African American boxer wrongfully imprisoned for 19 years in the US due to "an appeal to racism rather than reason".
 Eugene Debs, leader of the Socialist Party of the United States, was imprisoned by the US government for his opposition to the First World War.
 Mahatma Gandhi was imprisoned numerous times by the British both in South Africa and India.
 Emma Goldman was imprisoned for two years and then deported by the US government for her opposition to the First World War.
 Antonio Gramsci was a leftist Italian writer and political activist who was jailed and spent 8 years in prison. He was released conditionally due to his health situation and died shortly after.
 Palden Gyatso, a Tibetan Buddhist monk arrested during the Chinese invasion of Tibet for protesting, spent 33 years in Chinese prisons and labor camps where he was extensively tortured, serving the longest term of any Tibetan political prisoner.
 Anwar Ibrahim, was a Malaysian opposition party leader was imprisoned twice because of sodomy case.
 Kim Dae Jung served one term (1976–1979) and in 1980 was exiled to the United States, but returned in 1985 and became President of South Korea in 1998.
 Martin Luther King Jr. was imprisoned several times, most notoriously in Birmingham, Alabama.
 Leopoldo López, Venezuelan opposition leader, declared as prisoner of conscience by Amnesty International.
 John Maclean was imprisoned by the British government for his opposition to the First World War.
 Heinrich Maier was a Roman Catholic priest and leader of one of the most important resistance groups against Nazi Germany.
 Nelson Mandela was imprisoned from 1963 until 1990 in South Africa due to his anti-apartheid activism and organizing attacks on several government targets. He later became the President of South Africa between 1994 and 1999.
 Thomas Mapfumo was imprisoned without charges in 1979 by the Rhodesian government in what is now Zimbabwe for his Shona-language music calling for revolution.
 Carlos Menem, former Argentine president who was a political prisoner under the National Reorganization Process.
 Antonio Nariño (1765–1823) was a Colombian who translated the Declaration des Droits de L'Homme et du Citoyen into Spanish, and faced multiple terms in prison under charges of translating censored material.
 Jawaharlal Nehru, political activist, statesman, and first Prime Minister of India (1948–1963) was imprisoned several times for his nationalist activism against the British Raj, serving a total of over 9 years in incarceration.
 Dilma Rousseff former Brazilian president, was imprisoned by the right-wing military government between 1970 and 1973.
 Bertrand Russell was imprisoned by the British government for six months for opposing the First World War.
 Leonora Christina Ulfeldt was imprisoned in solitary confinement in a royal dungeon for twenty-one years as the wife and later widow of Count Corfitz Ulfeldt.
 Ai Weiwei, is a Chinese artist and political dissident from the People's Republic of China.
 Liu Xiaobo a Chinese pro-democracy activist, was imprisoned multiple times (from the late 1980s to prior to his death in 2017) in China by the Chinese government.
 Hossein Rajabian is an Iranian filmmaker, writer and photographer who was imprisoned for 3 years as a political prisoner between 2015 up to 2018 on charges related to his filmmaking in Evin prison in Iran.

Notable political prisons 
The following prisons have been recognized as incarcerating primarily political prisoners, and have therefore been called "political prisons":
 Bereza Kartuska, interwar Poland
Evin Prison, Iran
 Peter and Paul Fortress, Imperial Russia
 Shlisselburg Fortress, Imperial Russia
 Spaç Prison, Albania
 Peniche Fortress, Estado Novo, Portugal

References

Further reading
  Whitehorn, Laura.  (2003).  Fighting to Get Them Out.  Social Justice, San Francisco; 2003.  Vol. 30, Iss. 2; pg. 51.
 n.a. 1973. Political Prisoners in South Vietnam.  London: Amnesty International Publications.
 Luz Arce. 2003. The Inferno: A Story of Terror and Survival in Chile.  Madison, WI: The University of Wisconsin Press. 
 Stuart Christie. 2004. Granny Made Me An Anarchist: General Franco, The Angry Brigade and Me.  London: Simon & Schuster.  
 Christina Fink. 2001. Living Silence: Burma Under Military Rule.  Bangkok: White Lotus Press and London: Zed Press.  (See in particular Chapter 8: Prison: 'Life University' ). In Thailand , elsewhere  and 
 Marek M. Kaminski. 2004. Games Prisoners Play. Princeton University Press.  
 Ben Kiernan. 2002. The Pol Pot Regime: Race, Power, and Genocide in Cambodia under the Khmer Rouge, 1975–1975. Yale University Press. 
 Stephen M. Kohn.  1994.  American Political Prisoners.  Westport, CT: Praeger. 
 Barbara Olshansky.  2002.  Secret Trials and Executions: Military Tribunals and the Threat to Democracy.  New York: Seven Stories Press.

External links

 Azerbaijan: List of Political Prisoners in Azerbaijan (March 20, 2018) 
 Belarus: List of Political Prisoners
 China: List of Political Prisoners Detained or Imprisoned as of November 5, 2017 (1,414 cases)
 Israel: Statistics on Palestinians in the custody of the Israeli security forces (3 Jul 2018)
 Russia is holding over 70 Ukrainian Political Prisoners of War 
 Russia: List of Individuals Recognized as Political Prisoners by the Human Rights Centre Memorial and Persecuted in connection with the Realization of their Right to Freedom of Religion as of 29 October 2017 
 Turkey: Political Prisoners: Statistics (15 July 2016)

 
Imprisonment and detention
 
Political opposition
 
Political repression